Adventure Inc. is a dramatised adventure television series produced primarily in Canada which aired from 30 September 2002 to 12 May 2003. It was a co-production of Fireworks Entertainment (Canada), Tribune Entertainment (United States), M6 (France), Amy International (UK), and Tele München (Germany). The series premise was inspired by the work of modern-day explorer Barry Clifford.

Distribution was by syndication throughout the United States and by Global in Canada. Following its only season, the episodes were aired in Canada on Space.

Series outline
The preamble and voiceover from the opening titles tell the premise of the show:

"My name is Judson Cross. I've been called everything from a treasure hunter to a thrill seeker, but personally I like to think of myself as a professional explorer. My company is Adventure, Inc. and we're in the business of finding things - things that are priceless, dangerous, sometimes even unexplainable. My crew will go anywhere and risk everything. Adventure really is our business".

As he travels along different corners of the world, Cross is accompanied by two partners: Mackenzie (Karen Cliche) and Gabriel (Jesse Nilsson).

Publicity

Fireworks International went into Cannes with Adventure Inc., and with its star Michael Biehn worked the Croisette hard to promote the show. Biehn was joined by executive producer Gale Ann Hurd, who had gotten Biehn roles in The Terminator and Aliens, both films they had done with Hurd's then-husband James Cameron. Now divorced, she and Biehn hoped to make a splash with this TV show.

The show's main character is Judson Cross, a seafaring adventurer-for-hire, and was originally Hurd's idea, based partly on the real-life exploits of her close friend, explorer Barry Clifford, discoverer of the Whydah Gally (the world's only authenticated pirate shipwreck). "It's not common in television to have a character inspired by real events and real character," she said. The research vessel, Vast Explorer, featured in the show was named in honor of the ship used by Clifford.

Hurd maintained that the one big difference between film and television was budgets, and that in relation to her films, Adventure Inc.'s budget was "a very small percentage." Legendary guerrilla filmmaker Roger Corman helped Hurd to deliver the series on time and on budget. "What I think prepared me for television was my time with Roger Corman, where we neither had time nor money to finish our projects," she said. "Instead of as a negative, though, I've come to see it as a positive thing."

Cast and characters

 Michael Biehn - Judson Cross
 Karen Cliche - Mackenzie Previn
 Jesse Nilsson - Gabriel Patterson

Notable actors appearing

 Christien Anholt
 Steve Bacic
 Noel Clarke
 Vincent Corazza
 Ellen Dubin
 Von Flores
 Charlotte Lucas
 Lisa Marcos
 Denis Ménochet
 Deborah Odell
 Eva Pope
 John Ralston
 Carlo Rota
 Alice Taglioni
 Christopher Villiers
 Gary Webster
 Chris Geere

Television
The show was first broadcast in the US from 30 September 2002 to 12 May 2003. Despite being a part-UK production, it was never broadcast in the UK until September 2008 (like its stablemate Queen of Swords) on the Zone Thriller channel. Again, it was made in widescreen 16/9 but shown in pan and scan 4/3.

The show currently airs on the UK channel Film24, Sky157 every Friday night as part of 'Action Stations' evening.

Episodes

Production notes
Filmed in 16:9 but generally broadcast in 4:3 pan and scan.
Michael Biehn was offered the role after he worked with Gale Anne Hurd on Clockstoppers (2002).
The show has worldwide locations but being a Canadian/United Kingdom/France production, it was filmed firstly in Toronto, Canada; then the cast moved to Bristol, England, and finally to Marseille, France using local film crews and technicians. The worldwide locations were done by using establishing shots with Toronto standing in for many cities; Bristol stood in for London.
When filming in Canada, the show used the ship Vast Explorer and in Marseille Janus II.
Jesse Nilsson died from pneumonia related heart failure on 25 April 2003 in North York, Ontario Canada before the final episode was broadcast. A tribute was added to the last few frames of said episode: "In memory of Jesse Nilsson 1977–2003." Nilsson's passing led to the cancellation of the series. Like the TV show Kindred: The Embraced with Mark Frankel, this show ended when an actor died unexpectedly.

DVD releases
In Japan the series was released in 2009 on 11 DVDs NTSC Region 2 with the original English soundtrack, optional dubbed Japanese soundtrack and subtitles and 16:9 aspect ratio.  There are two episodes per DVD in no particular episode order.

In Canada, Alliance Home Entertainment, in April 2011, released the complete series on DVD in Region 1 (Canada only) on a six disc set in episode order with a 16:9 aspect ratio as originally filmed and not the 4:3 pan and scan often broadcast.

References

External links
 
 Adventure Inc. at The TV IV
 Space: Adventure Inc.
 Program summary by Michael Fylyshtan, a steadicam operator on the series
 Adventure Inc. program fansite
 

Television shows shot in Bristol
2002 Canadian television series debuts
2003 Canadian television series endings
2000s Canadian drama television series
Fictional archaeologists
Treasure hunt television series
Global Television Network original programming
Television series by Tribune Entertainment
British fantasy television series